Events from the year 1666 in Denmark.

Incumbents 

 Monarch – Frederick III

Events 
 1 August – Anders Bording's Den Danske Mercurius, Denmark's first newspaper, is published for the first time.

Undated 

 Holmen Cemetery, the oldest cemetery in Denmark still in use, relocates to its current location in Østerbro

Births 
 22 February – Christian Christophersen Sehested, nobleman (died 1740)
 16 June – Johan Conrad Ernst, architect (died 1750)

Deaths 
 Hannibal Sehested, statesman (died 1609)
 23 September  Hannibal Sehested, diplomat (born 1609)
 30 October – Iver Krabbe, nobleman and military officer (born 1602)

References 

 
Denmark
Years of the 17th century in Denmark